Andre Dirrell (born September 7, 1983) is an American professional boxer who held the IBF interim super middleweight title from 2017 to 2018. As an amateur, he won a bronze medal in the middleweight division at the 2004 Olympics. His younger brother Anthony Dirrell is also a professional boxer.

Amateur career
Dirrell and his younger brother Anthony began boxing while still in elementary school in their hometown of Flint, Michigan. The brothers have been trained from the beginning by grandfather Leon "Bumper" Lawson Sr., a former sparring partner of Muhammad Ali, and uncle Leon Jr.

Dirrell was a standout as an amateur and won the 2003 United States national amateur championships at middleweight. He also competed at the 2003 Pan American Games, with his results being:
 Lost to Yordanis Despaigne (Cuba) 20-21

He qualified for the Olympic Games by finishing in first place at the 1st AIBA American 2004 Olympic Qualifying Tournament in Tijuana, Mexico. Prior to the Athens Games he won the 2004 Acropolis Boxing Cup in Athens, Greece by defeating Cuba's Yordanis Despaigne in the final of the middleweight division.

He won the middleweight bronze medal for the United States at the 2004 Olympics in Athens, Greece. His results were:
 Defeated Ha Dabateer (China) 25–18
 Defeated Nabil Kassel (Algeria) RSC 2 
 Defeated Yordanis Despaigne (Cuba) 21–20
 Lost to Gennady Golovkin (Kazakhstan) 18–23

Dirrell completed an amateur record of 210–26.

Professional career
Dirrell began his professional career in 2005. A southpaw possessing exceptional athleticism and the ability to switch-hit, he was considered among boxing's top young prospects following an extensive amateur career. Dirrell defeated future world title challenger Curtis Stevens on HBO's Boxing After Dark in June 2007.

Super Six World Boxing Classic
Dirrell was one of the six super-middleweights who competed in Showtime's Super Six World Boxing Classic, a boxing tournament, along with Arthur Abraham, Andre Ward, Carl Froch, Mikkel Kessler and Jermain Taylor. His first fight and only loss was against England's Carl Froch on October 18 for the WBC Super Middleweight Championship. Two of the judges scored the fight 115-112 for Froch, with the third scoring it 114-113 for Dirrell.

On March 27, 2010, Dirrell faced undefeated former Middleweight Champion Arthur Abraham in Detroit, Michigan. In the fourth round, Dirrell knocked Abraham down for the first time in his career. Dirrell was outboxing Abraham throughout the bout and comfortably ahead on the scorecards 97-92, 98-91, and 97-92. In the 11th round, a slick spot in the corner of the ring caused Dirrell to slip to one knee. While down, Abraham delivered a punch to the chin of Dirrell; a delayed reaction was followed by Dirrell lying on the ground, unconscious and shaking. The referee ruled the blow by Abraham an intentional foul and awarded Dirrell a victory via disqualification. Some critics contested the ending of the fight, claiming that Dirrell may have overreacted after Abraham's final punch. However, Dirrell said he was really knocked out and did not know what happened after he fell down.

On October 7, 2010, Dirrell declined to face his friend and eventual Super Six tournament winner Andre Ward, and announced that he was withdrawing from the tournament due to neurological issues.

After Super Six
Dirrell took a 21-month layoff to heal from the neurological injuries sustained in the Abraham fight. Dirrell defeated Darryl Cunningham via second-round technical knockout.

Thirteen months after that, Dirrell made a return to the ring with a unanimous decision win against Michael Gbenga after knocking him down in round 9.

Andre was set to headline Friday Night Fights on April 12, 2013, but withdrew for undisclosed reasons.

Eighteen months after the Gbenga fight, Dirrell returned to score a fifth-round KO against Vladine Biosse.

Dirrell vs. DeGale 
On May 23, 2015, Andre Dirrell fought against British star James DeGale at the Agganis Arena in Boston. DeGale gained two knockdowns in the second round, which proved to be the difference as he won a unanimous decision over Dirrell to win a 168-pound world title. DeGale won 114-112 on two judges’ scorecards and 117-109 on the third.

Dirrell vs. Uzcategui I 
On May 20, 2017, Dirrell faced Jose Uzcategui for the vacant IBF interim super middleweight title. Uzcategui was disqualified in the eighth round for punching after the bell, and Dirrell was awarded the DQ victory. After the fight was stopped, Dirrell's trainer and uncle Leon Lawson approached Uzcategui and sucker-punched him before fleeing the scene. After the incident, Dirrell apologized for his trainer's actions.

Dirrell vs. Uzcategui II 
In the rematch, Uzcategui dominated Dirrell over eight rounds, and forced Dirrell's corner to stop the fight right at the beginning of the ninth round.

Dirrell vs Cabrera 
In his comeback fight, Dirrell fought and defeated Juan Ubalado Cabrera via KO in the fifth round.

Dirrell vs Brooker 
On July 31, 2021, Dirrell fought Christopher Booker. Dirrell finished his opponent early, by dropping him three times in the third round, forcing the referee to stop the fight.

Professional boxing record

References

External links

Andre Dirrell profile at Premier Boxing Champions
Andre Dirrell on Abraham, Kessler and Froch at BoxingInsider
Andre Dirrell - Profile, News Archive & Current Rankings at Box.Live

1983 births
Living people
Boxers at the 2004 Summer Olympics
Boxers from Michigan
Medalists at the 2004 Summer Olympics
Olympic bronze medalists for the United States in boxing
Sportspeople from Flint, Michigan
Winners of the United States Championship for amateur boxers
American male boxers
African-American boxers
Super-middleweight boxers
Middleweight boxers
Boxers at the 2003 Pan American Games
Pan American Games competitors for the United States
21st-century African-American sportspeople
20th-century African-American people